Automeris larra is a moth of the  family Saturniidae. It is found in South America, including Brazil, French Guiana, Venezuela, Colombia, Peru, Bolivia and Ecuador.

Subspecies
Automeris larra larra
Automeris larra eitschbergeri (Peru, Ecuador)

External links
Silk moths

Hemileucinae
Moths described in 1855
Moths of South America